The 1969 Sandown Three Hour Datsun Trophy Race was an endurance race for Series Production Touring Cars staged at the Sandown circuit in Victoria, Australia on 14 September 1969. It was the fourth running of the race which was to become the Sandown 500.

The race was won by Allan Moffat and John French driving a Ford XW Falcon GTHO.

Classes
Each car competed in one of five classes:
 Class A : Up to $1850
 Class B : $1851 to $2250
 Class C : $2251 to $3000
 Class D : $3001 to $4500
 Class E : Over $4500

Results 

 Of the 41 cars which started the race, six have not been accounted for in the above table.
 The McPhee / Mulholland Ford Falcon, which was provisionally placed third outright, was excluded from the results as McPhee had exceeded the two hour maximum driving time allowed for each driver.

References

Further reading
 Australian Motor Manual, November 1969
 Holden, The official racing history, © 1988
 The Age, Monday, 15 September 1969
 The Age, Wednesday, 17 September 1969
 The Australian Racing History of Ford, © 1989

External links
 Touring Cars 1969, www.autopics.com.au

Motorsport at Sandown
Sandown Three Hour Datsun Trophy Race
Pre-Bathurst 500
September 1969 sports events in Australia